The  is a local rail line in Gunma, Japan, and is part of the East Japan Railway Company (JR East) network.

Operations

Stations

Rolling stock

Present
 211-3000 series 4-car EMUs (since August 2016)
 651-1000 series 7-car EMUs (Kusatsu limited express services since March 2014)

Former
 115-1000 series 4-car EMUs (until March 2018)
 185 series 7-car EMUs (Kusatsu limited express services until March 2014)

Four-car 211 series EMUs entered service on the line from 22 August 2016.

History

Freight services between Shibukawa and Ōshi ceased as of 1 October 1966.

The Naganohara-Kusatsuguchi to Ōshi line was formally closed as of 1 May 1971. CTC signalling on the entire line was also commissioned at the same time.

With the privatization of JNR on 1 April 1987, the Agatsuma Line came under the ownership of JR East.

It had been proposed to extend the line to Nagano, but geological exploratory drilling revealed extensive faulting beyond Ōmae, and as any extension would have required extensive tunnelling, this was considered impractical.

Yanba Dam construction
Construction of the diversion was well advanced when a change of government in 2009 resulted in the project being halted. Another change of government in 2012 revived the project. Services on the old section of the line were suspended following the last scheduled service on 24 September 2014 to allow commissioning of the new alignment. The new alignment opened for passenger services on 1 October 2014. The new route is 0.3 km shorter, resulting in the shortest tunnel in Japan, the 7m Tarusawa Tunnel, being abandoned, although it is not inundated by the new dam.

Points of interest
The Agatsuma Line is noted for numerous onsen hot springs along the route. The famous hot springs at Kusatsu are some distance north of the line, but several rural onsen such as those at Shima, Sawatari, Kawarayu, and Shiriyaki are more accessible.

Mount Asama, Mount Kusatsu-Shirane, and the Agatsuma Canyon can all be seen from the Agatsuma Line, though the canyon will be inundated when the Yanba Dam is commissioned.

References

 
Lines of East Japan Railway Company
Rail transport in Gunma Prefecture
Railway lines opened in 1945
1067 mm gauge railways in Japan